Aaron Herbert De Groft (born c. 1966) is an American museum director, author, and art curator. He was the former director for the Muscarelle Museum of Art at the College of William & Mary before he joined the Orlando Museum of Art in Florida in 2021. He was fired from the latter position in June 2022 amid a scandal caused by possible inauthentic Jean-Michel Basquiat paintings and an FBI raid. 

After the Basquiat affair, a pattern of unattributed works linked to De Groft throughout his career emerged, including works purportedly by Paul Cézanne, Titian, and Jackson Pollock.

Early life
Aaron Herbert De Groft was born to Herbert W. De Groft. He grew up in Smithfield, Virginia, and attended Smithfield High School where he played baseball, football, and wrestling. He was Salutatorian for his class of 134 students, and graduated in June 1984.

Education and career
De Groft attended university at the College of William & Mary in Williamsburg, Virginia, where he majored in history and graduated with a Bachelor of Arts degree in 1988. During that time, he took a position at the Muscarelle Museum of Art under then-director Glenn D. Lowry who had him performing manual jobs before moving into more of a research role. He went on to earn a master's degree in art history and museum studies with a speciality in contemporary American painting at the University of South Carolina-Columbia. He attended Florida State University, where he studied art history and earned his PhD in 2000 with a dissertation called "John Ringling In Perpetua Memoria: The Legacy and Prestige of Art and Collecting". While at FSU, he contributed to the Winterthur Portfolio academic journal, writing an article called "Eloquent Vessels/Poetics of Power", focusing on the pottery of David Drake.

He has edited one book, authored two books on his own, and co-authored three more, subjects of which include the Ca' d'Zan, Caravaggio, Fred Eversley, Michelangelo, and John and Mable Ringling. He wrote the preface for Building the Brafferton: The founding, funding, and legacy of America's Indian School. In October 2021, Orlando Magazine named him one of Orlando's 50 most powerful people in the entertainment, sports, and the arts, coming in at number four.

De Groft stayed in Florida for the early part of his career. He was the director at the John and Mable Ringling Museum of Art for 11 years, followed by the Cummer Museum of Art and Gardens in Jacksonville, both located in the state. He worked to save the Ca' d'Zan mansion in Sarasota, Florida, and oversaw the $15 million conservation and restoration budget for the project, after which he was invited to apply to become director of the Muscarelle Museum of Art in Williamsburg, Virginia, a position which he accepted.

Muscarelle Museum of Art
At Muscarelle, De Groft oversaw "the first-ever international loan exhibition of Botticelli's works" in America. He also arranged for some of Michelangelo's pieces that "almost never travel" to be shown there in 2013 during the exhibit "Michelangelo: Sacred and Profane; Masterpiece Drawings from the Casa Buonarroti". De Groft is largely credited for saving the museum from closing when the budget was substantially slashed in 2002. 

While at Muscarelle, De Groft directed the purchase of an unattributed painting that he credited to Paul Cézanne. De Groft partnered with art historian and Muscarelle Museum's chief curator John Spike to authenticate the painting, assisted by a William & Mary chemistry associate professor and a paintings conservator from the Colonial Williamsburg Foundation. The authentication of the Cézanne piece was followed by a piece attributed to Titian. The purported Titian was from 1539-40 and titled Portrait of Federico II Gonzaga, Duke of Mantua. In 2002, De Groft partnered with J. Allen Tucker to write an article for the peer-reviewed journal Ultrastructural Pathology about the piece, where they posited it was authenticated in the early 1900s, challenged by German art historian August L. Mayer in 1938 who said the piece was not authentic, and then re-authenticated under De Groft's direction to "persuasively conclude that this portrait is authentic." The work traveled, eventually being displayed at the Musée du Luxembourg, a gallery in Paris, France, where William T. Walker of William & Mary said, "The exhibition is the talk of the French capital." 

After the Basquiat affair, art historian Charles Hope lambasted De Groft's testing and authentication of the Titian, saying, "The portrait is, to most people's eyes including my own, a feeble work unworthy of Titian himself. I tend to be suspicious of art historians using exotic scientific techniques to boost the credibility of second-rate pictures. It is an extremely common practice, and seldom, in my experience, produces convincing results." After working at Muscarelle for 14 years, De Groft left in December 2018, at which point the museum named an endowment after him called The Aaron De Groft Endowment for Museum Excellence.

Orlando Museum of Art and Basquiat paintings scandal
De Groft accepted the director's position at the Orlando Museum of Art in February 2021 after Glen Gentele exited the position. In January 2022, De Groft was going to give a lecture on a piece by expressionist painter Jackson Pollock. The speech was cancelled when the painting's authenticity was called into question. 

He was in charge of a 2022 exhibition of Jean-Michel Basquiat paintings in a show called "Heroes & Monsters". The 25 Basquiat paintings were reportedly recovered from a storage unit in Los Angeles, California, in 2012. The paintings had never been seen before and, if real, have been estimated to be worth over $100 million. In February 2022, the New York Times raised questions about the authenticity and provenance of the paintings. De Groft commissioned art historian and academic Jordana Moore Saggese to authenticate the paintings for $60,000; she subsequently tried to distance herself from the report and asked her name be removed from the exhibition. Saggese stated De Groft fabricated an interview with her to represent the works as legitimate. De Groft emailed her, writing, "You want us to put out there you got $60 grand to write this? Ok then. Shut up. You took the money. Stop being holier than thou. Do your academic thing and stay in your limited lane." The FBI raided the museum on June 24, and on June 28 the board fired De Groft for the email correspondence and the fake paintings. The Orlando Weekly subsequently called him a "Simpsons-esque con man".

In December 2022, the editors of ARTNews named De Groft's conduct and the FBI raid as one of the "Most important art events of 2022". The Orlando Sentinel named the affair as one of the cities' biggest cultural news stories of 2022. Artnet News named it one of the biggest art world controversies of the year.

Retrospective analysis of authentication patterns
After De Groft was fired from the Orlando Museum of Art, his past authentications were called into question. Writing for Observer, journalist Alexandra Tremayne-Pengelly said, "[De Groft] has exhibited a pattern of acquiring unremarkable paintings at auction and then attributing them to masters." Art advisor Todd Levin said, "De Groft has a history of being involved with so-called discoveries. The question that remains is how accurate has his past performance of reattributing works been?"

Personal life
De Groft married Kathryn Lee (née Gardner) at the Ashland Place United Methodist Church in Mobile, Alabama, on September 28, 1991. Kathryn is the daughter of Ann Medlin Gardner and pathologist Dr. William A. Gardner of Mobile, the latter of whom died in 2011. Like De Groft, she attended the University of South Carolina-Columbia. As of 2021, De Groft is still married lives in Baldwin Park, Orlando, Florida, and enjoys playing gin rummy with Kathryn. He also enjoys hunting, fishing, and exercising at the gym.

Painter Franz Kline is one of De Groft's favorite artists. Sculptures he appreciates are two works by Michelangelo, the first being Pietà, which he called "beyond amazing", and Rondanini Pietà, which he stated makes him cry.

Bibliography

As author 
De Groft, Aaron H. Ringling and Rubens. (2003) 
De Groft, Aaron H. Michelangelo: Anatomy as Architecture, Drawings By the Master. (2010)

As co-author 
De Groft, Aaron H.; Weeks, David C. A Pictorial History of John and Mable Ringling. (2003) 
De Groft, Aaron H.; Weeks, David C. Ca d'Zan – Inside the Ringling Mansion. (2004) 
De Groft, Aaron H; Eversely, Fred. Fred Eversley: 50 years an artist: Light & space & energy. (2017)

As editor
De Groft, Aaron H. Caravaggio Still Life with Fruit on a Stone Ledge. (2010)

Preface only 
Woodard, Buck; Moretti-Langholtz, Danielle. Building the Brafferton: The founding, funding, and legacy of America's Indian School.  (2019)

References

Directors of museums in the United States
American art historians
Living people
College of William & Mary alumni
University of South Carolina alumni
Florida State University alumni
Year of birth missing (living people)
People from Smithfield, Virginia